The Vale of Glamorgan has 740 listed buildings of which 4% are Grade I listed, 10% Grade II* listed and remainder Grade II listed.

Grade II entries are listed below alphabetically by town/village.

Grade I listed buildings

Grade II* listed buildings

Grade II listed buildings

Aberthin

Pen-y-Bryn, Pen-y-Lan Road 
Range of Buildings at Court Farm, Llanquian Road 
Gatehouse and Bridge to Great House, Llanquian Road 
The Sweetings (including attached Barn and Stable Range to West) 
Telephone Call-Box outside “Farmers Arms” Public House 
Glamorgan Yeomanry War Memorial, St. Hilary Down

Barry and Porthkerry

Watchtower at Watch House Bay 
Rocket Station adjacent to Watch Tower 
No. 10, Old Village Road (Rose Cottage) 
All Saints Church, Park Road 
Porthkerry Methodist Church, Porthkerry Road 
Barry Hotel, Broad Street 
No. 69 High Street 
No. 70 High Street 
No.71 High Street 
No.72 High Street 
Cenotaph, inc. area walls and steps at Gladstone Road 
Former Fire Station, Court Road 
Vale Resource Centre (former Polytechnic of Wales) 
College Fields Nursing Home (former Polytechnic of Wales) 
Springbank Nursing Home (former Polytechnic of Wales)
Caretaker's Cottage, ‘The Lodge’ former Polytechnic of Wales 
Chapel of former Polytechnic of Wales 
Municipal Buildings inc. library, (aka the Town Hall) King's Square 
Former Church of St. Nicholas 
Cross at former Church of St. Nicholas
Churchyard wall, former Church of St. Nicholas 
Cross in Churchyard of St. Cadoc's Church
Cadoxton Court, Mount Pleasant 
No. 1, Coldbrook Road East (The Old Schoolhouse) 
Former Customs House and Mercantile Marine Office, Station Street 
Lamp standard 1 of 6 outside former Barry Dock Offices 
Lamp standard 2 of 6 outside former Barry Dock Offices 
Lamp standard 3 of 6 outside former Barry Dock Offices 
Lamp standard 4 of 6 outside former Barry Dock Offices 
Lamp standard 5 of 6 outside former Barry Dock
Lamp standard 6 of 6 outside former Barry Dock Offices 
Friars Point House
Gate and Gatepiers, Friars Point House 
Lodge, Friars Point House 
North Hydraulic Pumping House, Barry No. 1 Dock 
Lifeboathouse adjacent to West Breakwater 
Lifeboathouse slipway adjacent to West Breakwater 
Walls of No. 3 Dock Basin, Barry Docks 
Operators Cabin to Sliding Bridge 
Breakwater Lighthouse, Barry Docks 
Grotto in Wenvoe Castle Park

Porthkerry

Porthkerry Viaduct (partly in Rhoose community) 
Lower Porthkerry Farmhouse, Porthkerry Road 
Upper Porthkerry Farmhouse 
Cross in Church of St. Curig 
The Old Schoolhouse - Cottage at West end of Churchyard

Bonvilston
Bonvilston Cottage 
Church of St. Mary 
Churchyard Cross at Church of St. Mary 
Village Farmhouse 
Great House (Ty Mawr)

Broughton

Monkton Isaf 
Barn with stable at Monkton Isaf

Colwinston

Churchyard Cross at Church of St. Michael and All Angels 
Churchyard Wall at Church of St. Michael and All Angels 
The Old Parsonage – S of Church of St. Michael and All Angels 
“The Sages” 
Milepost on Northeast side of A48 opposite Twmpath Farm 
Village House 
Milepost by Crackhill House (A48 Crack Hill) 
Pwllywrach 
East Garden House of Pwll-y- Wrach 
West Garden House of Pwll-y- Wrach

Corntown

Former Bethlehem Baptist Church (aka Ty Capel) 
Corntown Court 
Top Lodge 
Village Hall 
Corntown Farmhouse

Cowbridge

Nos. 1 - 3, The Butts 
Eastfield, Cardiff Road 
Nos. 6 and 7, Church Street 
Gate and End Piers, Walls, Railings, Gates at West. Entrance to Churchyard 
South-Southeast and Northwest Churchyard Walls 
The Boot House at Grammar School, Church Street 
SE Wall to Former Grammar School Garden, Church Street 
No.18 (East House), Eastgate 
Telephone Call-Box beside Eastgate Mews, Eastgate 
No. 44 (Ancient Druid), Eastgate 
No. 46 (The Armoury), Eastgate 
No. 48 (East Villa), Eastgate 
No. 49 Eastgate 
No. 54 (Heath House), Eastgate 
Nos. 56 and 58, Eastgate 
Telephone Call-Box outside Royal Mail Delivery Office, Eastgate
No. 66 (Colours), Eastgate 
No. 68 (Eastgate Gallery), Eastgate 
No. 70, Eastgate 
Nos. 71 & 73, Eastgate 
No. 77 Eastgate 
No. 79 (Citizens’ Advice Bureau) 
No. 1 (‘Aberthaw’/ ‘Glanthaw’) including forecourt wall and railings), High Street
No. 16 High Street 
No. 18 High Street 
No. 20 High Street 
No. 22 High Street 
No. 23 High Street 
Water Pump against SE Elevation of No. 23, High Street 
Telephone Call-Box outside No. 23, High Street 
No. 26 High Street
No. 27 High Street 
Mounting Block attached to Nos. 25 & 27 High Street 
No. 28 (Principality Building Society), High Street 
No. 29 High Street 
No. 30 (Ogmore Vale Bakery), High Street 
No. 31 High Street 
No. 33 (Lloyds Bank), High Street 
Former Coach House to rear of Nos. 34 & 36, High Street 
Nos. 35, 35a & 35b, High Street
Nos. 36-38 (Woodcocks and W. G. Davies), High Street 
Nos. 40-42 High Street
No. 39 (Xantippe), High Street 
No. 41 (Lloyds Chemist), High Street 
No. 43 High Street 
No. 48 (Duke of Wellington PH - including Rear Wing to Church Street), High Street
No. 50 High Street II
Nos. 51 & 53 (Vale of Glamorgan Public House), High Street 
No. 52 High Street 
No. 54 (Farthings Old Wine House), High Street 
No. 55 (Roddam Travel & Watts Morgan), High Street 
No. 56 High Street 
No. 58 High Street 
No. 60 (Former High Street Garage) 
No. 61 (HSBC (Midland Bank)), High Street 
No. 62 (Barclays Bank), High Street 
The Old Hall, High Street 
No. 63 (The Bear Hotel), High Street
No. 66 (Ye Olde Mason's Arms PH), High Street 
No. 77 (Llwyn Celyn), High Street 
No. 81 High Street 
No. 83 (Woodstock House), High Street 
Northwest Boundary Wall to No. 83, High Street 
War Memorial in front of Town Hall, High Street 
The Old Brewery Building, High Street 
Building to rear of Town Hall, Town Hall Square 
Northwest Garden Wall to Rose Cottage and Southwest Garden Walls to Old Hall & Grammar School Garden Southeast, Town Mill Road 
Rose Cottage, including forecourt garden walls, Town Mill Road 
The Poplars, including garden walls and gate, Town Mill Road 
Telephone Call-Box outside Hill View & The Haven, Westgate 
Nos. 1 & 3, Westgate 
No. 4 (National Westminster Bank), Westgate 
No. 21, Westgate 
United Free Church (Ramoth Chapel), Westgate
No. 34, Westgate
Water Pump near Police Station, Westgate 
Police Station, Westgate

Cwm Cidy

No 1. Cwm Cidy Farm 
No 2. Cwm Cidy Farm 
No. 3 Cwm Cidy Farm 
Cwm Cidy Farm Cottage

Dinas Powys

Remains of Dinas Powys Castle, off Lettons Way, Dinas Powys 
Downs Farmhouse, Sully Road (Prev. recorded under 22.02.00) 
Dinas Powys Parish Hall, Britway Road, Dinas Powys 
Church of St. Peter, Mill Road, Dinas Powys 
The Mount, Mount Road, Dinas Powys 
Old Court, The Square (aka The Twyn), Dinas Powys 
War Memorial, The Square (aka The Twyn), Dinas Powys 
Lon Twyn, Twyncyn, Dinas Powys 
Biglis Farmhouse, off Argae Lane, Dinas Powys 
Barn at Biglis Farm, Dinas Powys 
Little Orchard (nos 1-6), Murch, Dinas Powys

East Aberthaw

Aberthaw Lime and Cement Works 
East Kilns at Aberthaw Lime and Cement Works 
Aberthaw Signal Box 
The Granary 
Marsh House with attached garden wall

Ewenny

Garden Gateway with gates and attached wall at Ewenny Priory (House)
Garden wall linking North and South Gatehouses at Ewenny Priory (House) 
Northeast Precinct Wall at Ewenny Priory (House) 
Stable Court East range at Ewenny Priory (House)
Stable Court North range at Ewenny Priory (House) 
Stable Court West range at Ewenny Priory (House) 
Barn on Ewenny Down
Lampha Court and attached barn range 
Barn and attached ranges at Wallas Farm

Fonmon

Stables of Fonmon Castle 
Walls of walled gardens at Fonmon Castle 
Retaining walls of South Gardens at Fonmon Castle 
East Hall (aka ‘Rosedene’)
Walls surrounding Fonmon Pond inc. bridge and weir and wells 
Fonmon Well

Leckwith

Brynwell Farmhouse – Including attached agricultural buildings

Llanblethian

Roadside Cross, Church Road
Breach Farm House, Llantwit Major Road
Kingscombe, Llanmihangel Road 
Llanblethian House and No. 2, including Forecourt, Walls & Railings Church Road
Telephone Call-Box, Bridge Street, near Brook Cottage

Llancadle
Cliff Farmhouse

Llancarfan

Telephone Call-Box between Parish Hall and the bridge

Michaelston-le-Pit

Telephone Call-Box by Church Cottages 
1,2,& 3 Church Cottages 
Lychgate at Church of St. Michael 
Cwrt yr Ala House 
The Old Dairy at Cwrt yr Ala House

Outlying

Barn at Garn-Llwyd 
Llanfythin Farmhouse 
Gatehouse at Llanfythin Farmhouse 
Llanfythin Mill
Circular Pigsty at ‘The Meadows’ ( Formerly Tre-Aubrey House)
Llanfythin Mill House

Llandough, Llanfair

Church of St. Dochdwy 
Llandough Castle Flats 
Northeast, Southeast, and Southwest walls, gatepiers and railings enclosing Llandough Castle and Gatehouse 
Village Hall 
The Rectory

Llandough, Penarth

St. Dochdwy's Church 
Former National School and School House at No. 2 Lewis Road 
Pound Cottage
Barons Court Public House and Restaurant

Llandow

Great House 
Barn to East of Great House 
Ty Fry Farmhouse 
The Rectory

Llanfrynach

Cross base in churchyard of Church of St Brynach

Llangan

Church of St. Canna, Llangan 
Church of St. Mary, St. Mary Hill 
Telephone Call-Box opposite Mount Pleasant Farm, Llangan 
Churchyard Cross at Church of St. Mary, St. Mary Hill 
Churchyard Wall at Church of St. Mary, St. Mary Hill 
Cross Base at Village Farmhouse St. Mary Hill 
Saron Welsh Congregational Chapel, Treoes 
Chimney 100m North of Gelliaraul Farmhouse 
Mount Pleasant Farmhouse with attached barn 
The Old Rectory
Pantruthin-fach Farmhouse
Cowshed at Pantruthin-fach Farm 
The Star Inn, P.H.Treoes 
Treoes Farmhouse

Llanmaes

Cross in Churchyard of Church of St. Cattwg (Llanmaes Church) 
Railed Tomb to Nicholl Family E of Chancel at Church of St. Cattwg 
Dovecot at Llanmaes House (Great House)
Plaisted House 
Plaised Cottage 
Telephone Call-Box North of village centre (set away from road) 
Barn at Great House Farm 
‘Picketston’, Picketston

Llanmihangel

Terrace and steps at Yew Tree Pleasance, Plas Llanmihangel 
St. Anne's Well 
Rectory Farm

Llansannor

Barn at Court Farm
Cross in Churchyard of Church of St. Senwyr 
Westwing of Llansannor Court 
The Cottage Llansannor Court 
Former Cartshed and Granary at Court Farm 
Is-y-coed Farmhouse 
Llansannor House 
The Old Rectory

Llantrithyd

Ruins of Llantrithyd Place 
Telephone Call-Box, North of Parish Church 
Ty Draw Farmhouse
Agricultural outbuildings Ty Draw Farm

Llantwit Major and Boverton

Churchyard Cross, Church Street 
Churchyard walls and gates to St. Illtud's Church, Burial Lane 
Mid Well, Bakers Lane 
Circular Walls and Steps at West End Pond 
Batslays Farmhouse 
Boverton Park House (Prev. Boverton Place Farmhouse) 
Boverton Place 
‘The Causeway’ (Prev. No. 4. The Causeway and “Navron”) 
‘Navron’ (Prev. No. 4. The Causeway and “Navron”) 
Walls surrounding garden to West of Boverton House (Prev. doorway and walls of garden to West of Boverton House) 
Boverton House and attached stable block 
Garden Walls and railings of Boverton House 
Wall and Gateway Opposite Boverton House 
Cherry Tree Cottage (Prev. Nos. 1 and 2, Boverton Court Farm or Boverton Court Cottage)
Tudor Cottage (Prev. Nos. 1 and 2, Boverton Court Farm or Boverton Court Cottage)
Orchard House 
Former Chantry Priest's House, Burial Lane 
Chantry House, Hillhead 
Old Place or Llantwit Major Castle 
Forecourt Wall of Old Place 
Old Plas Cottage, West Street 
Well opposite Downcross Farm, West Street 
Downcross Farmhouse, Including Front Garden Wall (Prev. Downcross Farm, West Street) 
Footbridge over stream, West entrance to St. Illtud's Churchyard, Church of St. Illtud 
Tudor Tavern Public House 
1 Church Street (Prev. Nos. 1 and 1A, Church Street) 
Quaintways with attached garden wall (Prev. Ty Ny and Southern wing of Quaintways, Colhugh Street) 
Ty Ny with attached garden wall (Prev. Ty Ny and Southern wing of Quaintways, Colhugh Street) 
To-Hesg (Prev. Ty Hesg) Colhugh Street 
Old Rosedew House (Prev. Rosedew, Colhugh Street) 
Rosedew, Colhugh Street 
Bethel Baptist Church, Commercial Street
The Old House, Court Close (Prev. House to Northeast of Pear Tree Cottage, High Street) 
Plymouth House, Plymouth Street (Prev. Plymouth House (including mounting block)) 
Garden Wall, Gate and Mounting Block and Stables at Plymouth House 
Lodge to Dimlands (Prev. Dimlands House) Dimlands Road 
Tyle House 
Bethesda’r Fro Chapel with attached mounting block Eglwys Brewis Road 
Forecourt and Graveyard Gates, Gatepiers and Walls of Bethesda’r Fro Chapel Eglwys Brewis Road 
Malta House, 1 Flanders Road 
2 Flanders Road 
The Cottage with attached Garden Walls, 4 Flanders Road (Prev. Nos. 3 and 4, Flanders Road) 
Flanders Farmhouse, Flanders Road
Garden Wall and Gate of Flanders Road 
Lower House (Prev. Lower House Farm) Flanders Road 
Great Frampton 
Barn and Stable Range at Great Frampton Farmhouse 
Court House, High Street 
Sunny Bank, with attached Garden Walls, High Street 
Outhouse at Sunnybank 
The Old Police Station, Hillhead 
Little Frampton Farmhouse
Brooklands Cottage, Methodist Lane 
Summerhouse Fort, Summerhouse Camp  
Summerhouse Tower, Summerhouse Camp  
Fonmon Cottage (Prev. Fonmon House) Station Road
War Memorial, (Formerly base of war memorial)The Square 
Telephone Call-Box, Outside Old White Hart Public House 
Pear Tree Cottage with attached wall and mounting block (Prev. Corner House and Pear Tree Cottage [including mounting block], Turkey Street) 
Corner House (Prev. Corner House and Pear Tree Cottage [including mounting block], Turkey Street)
Rewley Court (Prev. Rawley Court) Turkey Street 
West Farm, West St. (Prev. West Farmhouse and garden walls) 
Front Garden Wall to West Farm 
Walls to [detached] garden to West Farm on SE side of West Street 
Hill Cottage, West Street
Swimbridge Farmhouse, with attached garden walls, Westhill Street 
The Swine Bridge, Westhill Street 
Downs Farmhouse, Wick Road 
Circular Pigsty, Downs Farm, Wick Road 
Windmill House (Prev. Frampton Windmill) Windmill Lane 
Old White Hart Inn Public House, Wine Street 
The Old School, including attached walling, Wine Street (Prev. The Old Rectory- (Formerly Presbytery and Llanilltud Fawr County Junior School))

Llysworney

Church of St.Tydfil 
Llysworney House (Great House) 
The Old Sheep Washery 
Former Church School 
Former Ebenezer Particular Baptist Church 
Milepost at the Carne Arms Public House

Nash

Pheasant House, Nash Manor
Pigeon House, Nash Manor

Old Beaupre

Former Hall Range to South of Old Beaupre Castle 
Old Beaupre Barn

Peterston-super-Ely

Llanwensan Fawr Farmhouse 
Telephone Call-Box, outside Fircot 
Croes-y-Parc Baptist Chapel [see also 16.20]
Road Bridge over Nant Criafol 
1 Pwll y Min Crescent 
2 Pwll y Min Crescent 
3 Pwll y Min Crescent 
4 Pwll y Min Crescent 
5 Pwll y Min Crescent 
6 Pwll y Min Crescent 
7 Pwll y Min Crescent
8 Pwll y Min Crescent
9 Pwll y Min Crescent
10 Pwll y Min Crescent
4 & 6 Cory Crescent
8 & 10 Cory Crescent
16 & 18 Cory Crescent
Rectory House (aka ‘The Old Rectory’)
Monument to Dafydd Williams Croes y parc Baptist Chapel

Penarth and Cogan
See also Listed buildings in Penarth

No. 41, Albert Road, (Former Post Office now restaurant) 
Pillar Box outside Post Office, Albert Road 
Albert Road County Infants’ School 
School House at No. 17 Albert Road 
Telephone Call-Box, on the edge of Albert Road Gardens 
Cenotaph, Alexandra Park 
No. 20 Archer Road 
No. 22 Archer Road 
No. 24, Archer Road, (see also 25, Victoria Road) 
North Lodge, (Piermaster's lodge) Windsor Gardens, Bridgeman Road 
Remains of Cwrt-y-Vil Grange (Castle), 2 Castle Avenue 
Telephone Call-Box at the corner of Church Avenue and Clive Place
Footbridge (Cogan Station), Cogan Hill 
Customs House, Dock Road 
Marine Buildings, Dock Road 
Inn at the Deep End, Esplanade 
Telephone Call-Box, in front of Pavilion and Pier
Penarth Pier, including Pavilion and Shops 
Coastguard Cottage, No. 2, Marine Parade (see also Nos. 1-5 Tower Hill Avenue) 
No. 13 Marine Parade (Greylands) 
No. 14 Marine Parade (Leigh Holme) 
Headlands School, Paget Place 
No. 2, Plymouth Road 
No. 4, Plymouth Road 
Nos. 6, Plymouth Road
Nos. 8, Plymouth Road 
Nos. 10, Plymouth Road 
Turner House Gallery, Plymouth Road
Telephone Call-Box close to junction with Stanwell Road
Public Library, Stanwell Road 
Trinity Methodist Church, Stanwell Road 
Church Hall, adj. Trinity Methodist, Stanwell Road 
Telephone Call-Box outside Nos. 5 and 5a, Royal Buildings, Station Approach 
No. 1 (of 5), Tower Hill Avenue
No. 2 (of 5), Tower Hill Avenue 
No. 3 (of 5), Tower Hill Avenue 
No. 4 (of 5), Tower Hill Avenue 
No. 5 (of 5), Tower Hill Avenue (see also No. 2 Coastguard Cottage, Marine Parade) 
Paget Rooms, Victoria Road 
No. 20, Victoria Road 
No. 22, Victoria Road (St Margarets) 
No. 25, Victoria Road (see also No. 24 Archer Road) 
No. 60, The Red House, Victoria Road 
All Saint's Parish Hall, Victoria Square 
Windsor Arcade Building 
Lloyd's Bank, Windsor Road 
Woodland Hall, Woodland Place
St. Joseph's Church, Wordsworth Avenue
St. Joseph's Presbytery, Wordsworth Avenue 
‘Sea Roads’ Cliff Parade

Pendoylan

Pendoylan Cottages 
Telephone Call-Box at Heol St. Cattwg (North Side) 
Cae’r Wigau Isaf 
Cae’r Wigau Uchaf 
Duffryn Mawr Farmhouse 
Hensol Bridge 
Hafod Lodge to Hensol Castle, (also known as Bottom Lodge)
Llwyn Rhyddid 
Ty Fry Lodge

Penllyn

Great House [Formerly Great House Farmhouse] 
Penllyn Castle 
The Lodge Cottage, Penllyn Castle 
The Cottage, ‘Penllyn Cottage’, Penllyn Castle 
Gatepiers, gates and boundary walls at entrance to Penllyn Castle 
Village Farmhouse 
Easternmost Salmon Well
Central Salmon Well 
Westernmost Salmon Well 
Church of St John the Evangelist 
The Old School House

Penmark

Cross in churchyard of Church of St. Mary 
Casberd family tomb in churchyard of Church of St. Mary 
Memorial to John and Mary Jenkins in churchyard of Church of St. Mary 
Sarah Elizabeth Jones Memorial Cross in churchyard of Church of St. Mary 
Kenson Bridge
Telephone Call-Box at centre of village / corner of Croft John

Peterston-super-Ely

Llanwensan Fawr Farmhouse 
Telephone Call-Box, outside Fircot 
Croes-y-Parc Baptist Chapel [see also 16.20]
Road Bridge over Nant Criafol 
1 Pwll y Min Crescent
2 Pwll y Min Crescent
3 Pwll y Min Crescent
4 Pwll y Min Crescent
5 Pwll y Min Crescent
6 Pwll y Min Crescent
7 Pwll y Min Crescent
8 Pwll y Min Crescent
9 Pwll y Min Crescent
10 Pwll y Min Crescent
4 & 6 Cory Crescent
8 & 10 Cory Crescent
16 & 18 Cory Crescent
Rectory House (aka ‘The Old Rectory’) 
Monument to Dafydd Williams Croes y parc Baptist Chapel

Rhoose

Lower Farmhouse Fontygary Road 
Lower Farm Cottage and attached garden wall, Brendon View Close 
Rhoose Council School, Fontygary Road

Cwm Ciddy
No 1. Cwm Cidy Farm 
No 2. Cwm Cidy Farm 
No. 3 Cwm Cidy Farm 
Cwm Cidy Farm Cottage

East Aberthaw
Aberthaw Lime and Cement Works 
East Kilns at Aberthaw Lime and Cement Works 
Aberthaw Signal Box 
The Granary
Marsh House with attached garden wall

Fonmon
Stables of Fonmon Castle
Walls of walled gardens at Fonmon Castle 
Retaining walls of South Gardens at Fonmon Castle 
East Hall (aka ‘Rosedene’) 
Walls surrounding Fonmon Pond inc. bridge and weir and wells 
Fonmon Well

Lower Porthkerry
Lower Porthkerry Farmhouse, Porthkerry Road
Upper Porthkerry Farmhouse

Porthkerry
Cross in Church of St. Curig
The Old Schoolhouse - Cottage at West end of Churchyard 
Porthkerry Viaduct (partly in Barry community)

Sigingstone
Green Farm II

St Andrews Major

Churchyard Cross, St Andrews’ Churchyard, St. Andrews Major
The Bier House, St Andrews’ Churchyard, St. Andrews Major 
Garn Hill and attached Garden Terrace, St. Andrews Major
1 Little Orchard, Murch
2 Little Orchard, Murch 
3 Little Orchard, Murch 
4 Little Orchard, Murch 
5 Little Orchard, Murch 
6 Little Orchard, Murch

St Athan

St. Athan
Anonymous Monument and railings in Churchyard of Church of St Athan 
St Athan War Memorial 
The Old Rectory (Balfour House) 
Myrtle Cottage and out buildings 
West Farmhouse 
West Orchard Farmhouse 
Aderyn [Prev. part of West Orchard Farmhouse]

Castleton
Bakehouse and Donkey Stable at Castleton Farmhouse 
Former Barn at Castleton Farm

East Orchard
Retainers Hall at East Orchard [part remains of East Orchard Castle] 
Dovecote at East Orchard [part of remains of East Orchard Castle]

Eglwys Brewis
Church of St. Brise

Flemingston
Detached Kitchen at Flemingston Court 
Garden Wall and House Ruins at Flemingston Manor 
Combination farm buildings at Flemingston Court Farm 
Telephone Call-Box North of parish church 
Gregory Farm / Yr Hen Fferm Dy

Gileston
Cross in Churchyard of Church of St Giles 
Stable Block at Gileston Manor 
Cheesehouse at Gileston Manor 
Walls and attached Summerhouse of Walled Gardens at Gileston Manor 
Pigsty at Gileston Manor 
Garden Walls along Roadside at Gileston Manor 
Kitchen Garden Wall at Gileston Manor 
Rose Cottage 
Telephone Call-Box at road junction in centre of the village

West Aberthaw
West Aberthaw Farmhouse 
Garden Wall of West Aberthaw Farmhouse 
Barn at West Aberthaw Farm 
Cart Shed at West Aberthaw Farm 
Bull House (Old Chapel) at West Aberthaw Farm 
Heavy Horse Stable at West Aberthaw Farm

St Brides Major

Ogmore by Sea
Ogmore Farm
Stables at Ogmore Farm
Old Star Cottage 
Barn at Ty Maen 
Sutton

St. Brides Major
Bryn Sion Presbyterian Chapel 
Pen-ucha’r Dre Farmhouse 
Castle upon Alun House and garden walls to South and East 
Former Byre at Castle upon Alun 
Cartshed, Castle upon Alun 
Churchyard Cross Church of St. Bridget 
The Old Vicarage 
Blackhall Farm 
Bee Boles at Blackhall Farm 
Clapper Bridge 
Pont Groes Gwta 
Barn and Cow Houses at Pen Ucha Dre

Dunraven Park
Grand Lodge 
Former Ice Tower and Banqueting Hall 
Boundary and Dividing Walls to Walled Garden 
Garden Building 
Entrance gateway with Flanking Wall at Dunraven House 
Boundary Wall and Entrance gate to S of Seamouth Lodge 
Seamouth Lodge 
Boundary Wall North of Seamouth Lodge 
Slade

Durval
Seamouth Cottage 
Dovecot at Durval Farm 
Fynnon y Winch [pump house]

Heol y Mynydd
Fynnon y Pant 
Evergreen Cottage

Southerndown
Sunshine House 
Clifton House and the Link

St. George’s Super-Ely

St. Bride’s
St.-y-Nyll Windmill Tower and Barn remains 
Church of St. Ffraid St. Bride's
St-y-Nyll

St. George’s
Churchyard Cross at Church of St. George 
Church Cottage
Ty Ffynnon

Coedarhydyglyn
Gate and Gatepiers, midway along South drive, Coedarhydyglyn 
Gate and Gatepiers beside South Lodge, Coedarhydyglyn

St. Hilary

Churchyard cross, Church of St. Hilary 
Bassett Family Tomb Enclosure, Church of St. Hilary 
The Bush Inn 
Pigsty in garden of Church Cottage 
No 1 Manor Cottages (Prev. Nos. 1 and 2, Manor Cottages) 
No. 2 Manor Cottages 
The Manor
Village Farm 
Telephone Call-Box opposite Village Farm
The Cottage 
New Beaupre

St. Mary’s Church

Church of St. Mary
Church Cottage, (aka Old Rectory) 
Fishweir Farmhouse 
Barn at Fishweir

St. Nicholas

Fountain to South of Dyffryn House 
Pompeian Garden, Dyffryn House 
Walled Garden, Dyffryn House 
Lower South Terrace at Dyffryn Gardens
Vine Walk and Kiosks, Dyffryn Gardens 
Cory Family chest-tomb at Church of St. Nicholas 
No. 3 Smiths Row (Blacksmith Cottages) 
No. 4 Smiths Row (Blacksmith Cottages) 
No. 5 Smiths Row (Blacksmith Cottages)
The Three Tuns 
Telephone Call-Box, A48 (North side) on approach to Church 
GPO pillar box, A48 (North side) on approach to Church 
St. Nicholas Church Hall 
St. Nicholas Church Hall House 
Cottrell Lodge

St Donats

St Donats

Churchyard Wall of Church of St Donat's inc. railings and Gate 
Nicholl-Carne Memorial Cross in Churchyard of Church of St Donat's
Cottage against Southeast Churchyard wall - Church of St Donat's 
The Old Rectory 
Wall of entrance forecourt at St Donat's Castle and part of Northwest Boundary Wall
Walls of entrance forecourt flanking the bridge at St. Donat's Castle
Staff house in NE corner of the entrance forecourt
Music Dept at Atlantic College (Prev. Former Coach House at Castle)
Former forecourt stables at St Donat's Castle
St. Donat's Arts Centre (Prev. Tithe Barn at St. Donat's Castle) 
Art Department of Atlantic College
Walls, Steps, Terraces, Pavilion, Summerhouse and cottage attached to the wall of the hanging gardens
Sundial at St Donat's Castle
The Cavalry Barracks 
Sea walls and towers at St Donat's Castle 
Watchtower to West of St Donat's Castle 
Top (East) Lodge to St Donat's Castle inc. attached garden wall 
North Lodge to St Donat's Castle 
East Boundary Wall of St Donat's Castle
Cartref 
Splott Farmhouse and adjoining Granary Wing

Marcross
Churchyard wall, gatepiers and gates, to church of holy trinity running along the road
Sundial in churchyard of Church of the Holy Trinity 
High wall comprising remains of Marcross Castle, bounding part of Southwest farmyard of Village Farm 
Freestanding outbuilding at Village Farm incorporating remains of Marcross Castle and sited on Southwest

Monknash
Church Farmhouse 
Garden wall of Church Farmhouse 
Outhouse range to South of Church Farmhouse
Dovecot at Monknash Grange (Prev. Remains of medieval dovecote) 
Monknash Forge 
Plough and Harrow Public House inc. front garden walls

Nash Point
Lower (West) Lighthouse and attached Keepers Houses, walls and ancillary buildings 
Fog Station at Nash Point Lighthouse 
Upper (East) Lighthouse and attached keepers houses, walls and ancillary buildings

Sully

Church of St John the Baptist ‘Sully Church’ 
Former Lodge & Screen Walls flanking driveway entrance to Sully Hospital 
Cog House [formerly Cog Farm including buildings and eight Rickstands] 
Planned Group of farm buildings at Cog Farm 
Eight Rickstands at N Side of Cog Farm 
Hayes Farm Windmill 
Church of St. Lawrence 
Limekiln, Ashby Road 
Barn at Home Farm 
Swanbridge House, St Mary's Well Bay Road

Sutton
 Sutton Farmhouse II*
Long Range of Outbuildings to Northwest of Sutton Farmhouse
Small Outbuilding immediately to West of Sutton Farmhouse

Walterston

Walterston Fach Farmhouse 
Barn at Trewallter Fawr

Wenvoe

Telephone Call-Box on village green, Wenvoe
Nant Bran Farmhouse 
Agricultural Range opposite Nant Bran Farmhouse 
Outbuildings to North of Nant Bran Farmhouse 
Former Bull Shed at Nant Bran Farm 
The Old Rectory 
Former Coach House and Stables at Wenvoe Castle 
Former Walled Kitchen garden wall at Wenvoe Castle – West Range 
Barn at Goldsland Farm 
Well House, Dyffryn Gardens 
Lidmore Farmhouse 
Lower South Terrace at Dyffryn Gardens 
Lions Steps, Dyffryn Gardens
Fountain to South of Dyffryn House 
Vine Walk and Kiosks, Dyffryn Gardens

Welsh St Donats
Churchyard Wall of Church of St. Donat 
Great House 
Pigsty at Ty-draw

Wick

Remains of Preaching Cross St James’ Church, Church Street 
Ruined Windmill Tower [off Church Street]
Primrose Cottage, Church Street
Bluebell Cottage, Church Street 
Lamb Cottage, Church Street 
Sycamore House, Church Street 
Brooks Farm and adjoining range, West Street 
Farm Range to NE of Brooks Farm 
Cow House and stable range to NE Brooks Farm

Green Isaf

Green Isha Farm with adjoining Stable and Dovecot 
Yr Hen Felin Wynt, Green Isaf

Trepit
Trepit Cottage, Trepit.

Picket

Mill, Threshing Barn and Cart Shed at Church Farm 
Outbuilding at Church Farm [1] 
Outbuilding at Church Farm [2] 
Outbuilding at Church Farm [3] 
Outbuilding at Church farm [4]

Ystradowen

Church of St Owain 
Churchyard Wall and Gates of Church of St Owain 
Llwynhelig House

See also
 Listed buildings in Wales

References

 
Buildings and structures in the Vale of Glamorgan
Vale of Glamorgan